Blade Runner is a 1982 science fiction film directed by Ridley Scott.

Blade Runner or Bladerunner may also refer to:

People
Oscar Pistorius (born 1986), South African athlete known as "the Blade Runner"

Arts, entertainment, and media

Television
Blade Runner: Black Lotus, a 2021 anime

Films
Blade Runner (franchise)
Blade Runner (1982), a film directed by Ridley Scott
Blade Runner 2049 (2017), its sequel, directed by Denis Villeneuve

Soundtracks
Blade Runner (soundtrack), the original soundtrack to the 1982 film, composed by Vangelis
Blade Runner 2049 (soundtrack), soundtrack to the 2017 film, composed by Hans Zimmer

Literature
Blade Runner (1982), a movie tie-in edition of Philip K. Dick's novel Do Androids Dream of Electric Sheep? (1968), upon which Scott's film is based
Blade Runner: A Story of the Future (1982), a novelization of the film, written by 
Blade Runner novel trilogy, written by K. W. Jeter
 Blade Runner 2: The Edge of Human (1994)
 Blade Runner 3: Replicant Night (1996)
 Blade Runner 4: Eye and Talon (2000)
A Marvel Comics Super Special: Blade Runner or Blade Runner, a 1982 comic book
The Bladerunner (1974), a novel by Alan E. Nourse
Blade Runner (a movie) (1979), a novella by William S. Burroughs based upon his film treatment of Nourse's novel

Video games
Blade Runner (1985 video game), a computer game for the Amstrad CPC, Commodore 64, and ZX Spectrum
Blade Runner (1997 video game), a PC video game

Sport
The Blade Runners, a professional wrestling tag team 
BladeRunners Ice Complex, a hockey facility in Pennsylvania

See also